Back in Love Again may refer to:

 "Back in Love Again" (Donna Summer song), 1978
 "Back in Love Again" (Misia song), 2012
 "(Every Time I Turn Around) Back in Love Again", a song by L.T.D.

id:Back in Love Again